Oldenlandia is a genus of flowering plants in the family Rubiaceae. It is pantropical in distribution and has about 240 species. The type species for the genus is Oldenlandia corymbosa.

Oldenlandia was named by Linnaeus in 1753 in Species Plantarum. The name honors the Danish botanist Henrik Bernard Oldenland (1697). Some species are important in ethnomedicine; a number (usually island endemics) are threatened species, with one species and one variety being completely extinct already.

Some botanists have not recognized Oldenlandia, but have placed some or all of its species in a broadly defined Hedyotis. More recently, the circumscription of Hedyotis has been narrowed to a monophyletic group of about 115 species and no longer includes Oldenlandia. The genus Oldenlandia, as presently defined, is several times polyphyletic and will eventually be reduced to a group of species closely related to the type species. This group, known informally as Oldenlandia sensu stricto, is sister to a section of Kohautia that will eventually be separated from Kohautia and named as a new genus.

Selected species

 Oldenlandia adscensionis (extinct: 1889)
 Oldenlandia aegialoides Bremek.
 Oldenlandia affinis
 Oldenlandia albonervia (Beddome) Gamble
 Oldenlandia aretioides
 Oldenlandia balfourii
 Oldenlandia bicornuta
 Oldenlandia cana Bremek.
 Oldenlandia capensis
 Oldenlandia cornata Craib
 Oldenlandia corymbosa L.
 Oldenlandia diffusa
 Oldenlandia forcipistipula Verdc.
 Oldenlandia galioides
 Oldenlandia gibsonii
 Oldenlandia glauca Blatter
 Oldenlandia lanceolata Craib
 Oldenlandia lancifolia (Schumacher) DC.
 Oldenlandia marcanii Craib
 Oldenlandia microtheca (D.F.K.Schldl. & Cham.) DC.
 Oldenlandia ocellata
 Oldenlandia oxycoccoides Bremek.
 Oldenlandia patula Bremek.
 Oldenlandia polyclada (F.Muell.) F.Muell.
 Oldenlandia pulvinata
 Oldenlandia sieberi Baker
 Oldenlandia sieberi var. congesta
 Oldenlandia sieberi var. sieberi (extinct)
 Oldenlandia spathulata
 Oldenlandia tenelliflora
 Oldenlandia tenelliflora var. papuana
 Oldenlandia thysanota (Halford) Halford
 Oldenlandia umbellata
 Oldenlandia uvinsae Verdc.
 Oldenlandia vasudevanii

References

External links
 Oldenlandia At: Search Page At: World Checklist of Rubiaceae At: Index by Team At: Projects At: Science Directory At: Scientific Research and Data At: Kew Gardens
 Oldenlandia At:Index Nominum Genericorum At: References At: NMNH Department of Botany
 Oldenlandia In: Species Plantarum At: Biodiversity Heritage Library
 CRC World Dictionary of Plant Names: M-Q At: Botany & Plant Science At: Life Science At: CRC Press

 
Rubiaceae genera
Pantropical flora